Trnávka is a municipality and village in Nový Jičín District in the Moravian-Silesian Region of the Czech Republic. It has about 800 inhabitants.

History
The first written mention of Trnávka is from 1307.

Sights
The landmark of Trnávka is a baroque castle from the 18th century with a partially preserved landscape park with a pond. The pond and its surroundings is protected as a nature reserve.

References

Villages in Nový Jičín District